John Brittas is an Indian politician, Journalist, managing director of Kairali TV (Malayalam Communications, Ltd.) and former Business Head of Asianet Communications. He was born on 24 October 1966, in Kannur into Alilakuzhy family in Pulikurumba. He was elected to Rajya Sabha from Kerala as CPI(M) nominee on 24 April 2021 and took oath on 8 June 2021.

Education

After primary education in a nearby school, he attended high school at Don Bosco Higher Secondary School, Mannuthy, Thrissur. He went to Sir Syed College (Taliparamba) in Kannur for his predegree. He had his bachelor's degree in Political Science from Payyanur College, Payyannur and master's degree in political science from Sree Kerala Varma College, Thrissur. He also studied for his law degree from Kerala Law Academy Law College, Trivandrum. He secured first rank in both the exams. In 1996, John Brittas completed his Master of Philosophy at Jawaharlal Nehru University.He completed his PhD at Jawaharlal Nehru University in 2022.

Career

Though he had a flair for writing and was involved in college level literary activities, journalism came his way by chance. It was for the sole purpose of getting a job that he had applied for the post of sub editor in Desabhimani, the mouth piece journal of Communist Party of India (Marxist). When he went to Delhi for higher pursuits, the newspaper transferred him to Delhi under its bureau chief Prabhakara Varma. In Delhi, even before joining his office, he was assigned to escort the then CPIM CM of Kerala to Punjab for a discussion with the "Akalis," a radical group screaming for a separate state in those days. Brittas acknowledges the exposure he got in Delhi at that very young age for all his achievements. He arrived in Delhi at a time when the political stage of India was undergoing radical changes. He became a witness to many major changes that designed the country's future both at the home front and in the international arena.

By the time Kairali TV was launched under Malayalam Communications Ltd by Communist party of India in the year 2000, Brittas had become a seasoned media personality. He was an ideal choice for the post of associate director in charge of the Delhi Bureau for Kairali TV - a leftist founded Malayalam Channel. That was the time when many of the print journalists were switching to visual media. Brittas also took it as an opportunity to dabble in the electronic media after a long association with the print media. After working for three years in Delhi, he was made the managing director of the channel and was transferred to Kerala.

After an eleven-year stint, he resigned from Malayalam Communications Ltd and became the CEO of Asianet Communications Limited on 2 May 2011.

On 27 February 2013 he got an offer from MCL as MD of new division and took charge in March 2013.

He acted in a Malayalam movie Velli Velichathil released in 2014 with mixed reviews.

Awards and accolades
John Brittas was the youngest correspondent to get the Central Hall pass in the Parliament. He has covered parliamentary proceedings for both Kairali TV and Desabhimani. He did first hand reporting for the general elections between 1991 and 1999. He also covered the general election in Nepal soon after the death of King Birendra. He was physically present in Ayodhya during the Babri Masjid demolition. He was the first journalist from India to reach Baghdad during the recent war in Iraq. From there, he not only reported for his channel but also wrote for various newspapers.

He got the Journalism Educational Award from the Goenka Foundation for his research on "The Impact of Globalization in Print Media". His maiden speech in the Rajya Sabha (Council of States) in India regarding judiciary and the appointment of  Supreme Court and High Court Judges  was praised by the Vice President of India and Ex-Officio Chairman, Rajya Sabha Hon'ble Shri M venkaiah Naidu.

Television
As Host

References

External links
John Brittas in Asianet

1966 births
Living people
Writers from Kannur
Indian opinion journalists
Indian male television journalists
Don Bosco schools alumni
Malayalam-language journalists
Journalists from Kerala
Television personalities from Kerala
20th-century Indian journalists
Male actors from Kannur